Fouad Haddad (1927–1985) was an Egyptian poet, who wrote in the Egyptian vernacular.

Life
Fouad Haddad was born in Cairo. His mother came from a Syrian family and his father was a Lebanese academic who later became an Egyptian citizen.

He joined the Egyptian Communist Party, and was jailed from 1953 to 1956 and 1959 to 1964. He collaborated with the composer Sayed Mekkawi, providing lyrics for Al-Masararati, a show broadcast on Egyptian National Radio and subsequently turned a television programme.

Fouad Haddad and his friend, the poet Salah Jaheen, were the subject of a 2011 television documentary by Dinah Hamza.

References

1927 births
1985 deaths
Egyptian male poets
20th-century Egyptian poets
20th-century male writers